Joanna Wołosz (born 7 April 1990) is a Polish volleyball player for Imoco Volley and Polish national volleyball team. She was part of the Poland women's national volleyball team at the 2010 FIVB Volleyball Women's World Championship in Japan.

Clubs
  SMS PZPS Szczyrk/Gedania Gdańsk (2007–2009)
  Impel Wrocław (2009–2011)
  BKS Stal Bielsko-Biała (2011–2013)
  Unedo Yamamay Busto Arsizio (2013–2015)
  KPS Chemik Police (2015–2017)
  Imoco Volley (2017–)

Awards

Clubs
 2015 Polish Supercup -  Champion, with Chemik Police
 2015–16 Polish League -  Champion, with Chemik Police
 2015-16 Polish Cup -  Champion, with Chemik Police
 2015–16 Polish League -  Champion, with Chemik Police
 2016-17 Polish Cup -  Champion, with Chemik Police
 2017–18 Italian League -  Champion, with Imoco Volley Conegliano
 2018 Italian Supercup -  Champion, with Imoco Volley Conegliano
 2018–19 Italian League -  Champion, with Imoco Volley Conegliano
 2018–19 CEV Champions League -  Runner-Up, with Imoco Volley Conegliano
 2019 Italian Supercup -  Champion, with Imoco Volley Conegliano
 2019 FIVB Volleyball Women's Club World Championship -  Champion, with Imoco Volley Conegliano
 2019-20 Italian Cup (Coppa Italia) -  Champion, with Imoco Volley Conegliano
 2020 Italian Supercup -  Champions, with Imoco Volley Conegliano
 2020-21 Italian Cup (Coppa Italia) -  Champion, with Imoco Volley Conegliano
 2020–21 Italian League -  Champion, with Imoco Volley Conegliano
 2020–21 CEV Women's Champions League -  Champion, with Imoco Volley Conegliano
 2021 Italian Supercup -  Champions, with Imoco Volley Conegliano
 2021 FIVB Volleyball Women's Club World Championship -  Runner-Up, with Imoco Volley Conegliano
 2021-22 Italian Cup (Coppa Italia) -  Champion, with Imoco Volley Conegliano
 2021–22 Italian League -  Champion, with Imoco Volley Conegliano

Individuals
 2016-17 Polish Cup "Best Setter"
 2017–18 Italian League "Most Valuable Player"
 2017–18 CEV Champions League "Best Setter"
 2019 FIVB Volleyball Women's Club World Championship "Best Setter"
 2020 Summer Olympics European Qualification "Best Setter"
 2020-21 Italian Cup (Coppa Italia) "Most Valuable Player"
 2021 FIVB Volleyball Women's Club World Championship "Best Setter"

References

1990 births
Living people
Polish women's volleyball players
Volleyball players at the 2015 European Games
European Games medalists in volleyball
European Games silver medalists for Poland
People from Elbląg
21st-century Polish women